The Poiana Ruscă Mountains (part of the Western Carpathians) are a Carpathian mountain range in western Romania. The mountains are situated roughly south of the Mureș River, northeast of the Timiș River, and west of the Strei River. The Bega River emerges from these mountains. The nearest large towns are Lugoj, Hunedoara, and Caransebeș.

Mining
The mountains contain resources such as magnetite, iron, thorium and lead, and as such are the site of many mines. In the nineteenth century, the mountains were also centers of gold, silver, and salt mining and production.  However, after 1990 some mines were closed and others abandoned, leaving waste ore and radioactive mines still unprotected in the mountain range.

Divisions of the mountains
 Poiana Ruscă (literally: Ruscă Meadows)
 Lipova Plateau (Podișul Lipovei)
 Bega-Timiș Groove (Culoarul Bega-Timiș) 
 Orăștie Groove (Culoarul Orăștiei), including the Hațeg Depression (Depresiunea Hațegului)

References

Mountain ranges of Romania
Mountain ranges of the Western Romanian Carpathians
Western Romanian Carpathians